Jonathan Aryan Jafari  (born March 24, 1990), better known online as JonTron, is an American YouTuber, comedian, singer and media reviewer. He is best known for his eponymous YouTube web series JonTron, where he reviews and parodies video games, films and other media.

Jafari is the co-creator and former co-host of the Let's Play webseries Game Grumps, and co-created the video game entertainment website Normal Boots. , his YouTube channel JonTronShow has 6.6 million subscribers and 1.2 billion views.

Early life
Jonathan Aryan Jafari was born in Rancho Palos Verdes, California, on March 24, 1990, to Afshin and Irene Jafari. He is of Hungarian descent on his mother's side, and Iranian descent on his father's side. He attended Palos Verdes Peninsula High School from 2004 to 2008,  where he met fellow YouTubers Jirard "The Completionist" Khalil, and Barry Kramer, who was also the first editor for "Game Grumps".

Career

Early career
Jafari created a Newgrounds account under the name "BirdmanXZ6" in 2003, and uploaded five animations depicting anthropomorphic onions. In 2006, he made a YouTube account under the same name. Jafari uploaded videos on ScrewAttack.com in 2010, reviewing games such as GoldenEye 007 and at ScrewAttack, he met creator Austin "PeanutButterGamer" Hargrave.

JonTron
On August 31, 2010, Jafari created a YouTube channel called JonTronShow. He stated that he chose the name JonTron because it was "reminiscent of technology" and that the show was originally going to be called JonTron 2.0. He uploaded a two-part review of the Nintendo 64 version of the game Daikatana, the first installment in his JonTron series. In each episode of JonTron, Jafari reviews singular games, as well as games of a particular theme, franchise, or genre. He is usually accompanied by his green-cheeked parakeet, Jacques, who speaks with a robotic voice. Jafari usually incorporates elements of sketch comedy into these episodes, to display his reactions to the video game that he is reviewing. According to Jafari, in an episode of the Internet gaming webseries Game Grumps, Jacques was originally to speak in a stereotypical jive voice, with Jafari's mouth being super-imposed onto the character's face, rather than his eyes glowing red whenever he talked. In his early days, he reviewed video games, showing fondness for Nintendo games and those developed by British game developer Rare mainly the games they made during the 90s, while being very critical of the games made since then like Star Fox Adventures and Banjo-Kazooie: Nuts & Bolts.  Jafari has reviewed numerous video game adaptations of popular franchises, such as Hercules, Barbie, Home Alone, Star Wars and Conan the Barbarian, as well as relatively unknown games for the NES like Monster Party and Takeshi's Challenge. He has also reviewed various unlicensed games, particularly based on the Pokémon franchise, as well as the 1997 film Titanic and Disney films. In the latter, he observed China as being "farther away from U.S. jurisdiction, and much better at Disney bootlegging" and also remarked on unofficial online games based on the company's films. Jafari occasionally uploads skits, as well as film reviews. For his Halloween Specials, he reviewed the anthology horror television series Goosebumps and Are You Afraid of the Dark?.

According to Jafari, in an episode of Game Grumps, JonTron began achieving notability after a post on Reddit featuring Jafari's review of the Super Nintendo Entertainment System game DinoCity reached #1 on the website. In 2011, Jafari created two now-defunct spin-off Let's Play channels. The first, "JonTronStarcraft", has two videos of Jafari playing Blizzard Entertainment's real-time strategy game StarCraft. The second channel, "JonTronLoL", has four videos of Jafari playing the MOBA game League of Legends. Both channels have fewer than 25,000 subscribers. JonTronShow reached 1 million subscribers in May 2014.

In 2013 Paul Tamburro of CraveOnline said "Mixing a large dollop of offbeat humour with a light sprinkle of insightful commentary, JonTrons reviews of games of old have inspired many imitators, but none have proven to be more hilarious." Time magazine listed JonTron as 2015's seventh most searched Internet meme on Google.

In May 2015, Jafari released a spin-off web series on his YouTube channel titled JonTron's StarCade, in which he reviews games based on the Star Wars franchise. The webseries included cameos from numerous other Internet personalities and actors, such as Egoraptor, Markiplier, Nathan Barnatt, Ross O'Donovan, and Kyle Hebert. The series was produced by Maker Studios, a subsidiary of The Walt Disney Company, and concluded in December 2015, after nine episodes.

Jafari occasionally uploads videos in which he comments on matters that he finds important, which are usually related to gaming. This occurred most recently in 2016, with a video made in response to Blizzard Entertainment shutting down private servers of the massively multiplayer online role-playing game World of Warcraft. Jafari mostly criticized the shutdown of one of the most popular private servers, Nostalrius, which was a copy of the 1.12 version of the game. Jafari's video helped to raise awareness on this subject, and lead to thousands of signatures on a Change.org petition.

Throughout 2019 and 2020, Jafari has continued to broaden the range of media covered on his show, instead of solely traditional video games. Notable examples of topics are Flex Tape, rapper Soulja Boy's SouljaGame console, actress Gwyneth Paltrow's company Goop and its web series The Goop Lab, actor Dan Aykroyd's Crystal Head Vodka brand, and the 2007 TV series Kid Nation.

JonTron is largely credited with public awareness of Flex Tape and Phil Swift, and its transformation into an internet meme. The original video on the subject has received over 66 million views as of October 2021, and the sequel has over 26 million, and features a cameo from Swift himself.

NormalBoots
NormalBoots was created in late 2010 by Jafari and Austin "PeanutButterGamer" Hargrave to act as a hub where Jafari and Hargrave could post content and receive advertisement revenue. Soon after its creation, Indie Games Searchlight and Cold Morning joined the group. In June 2011, the YouTube channel Continue? joined, while in August of the same year, Underbelly joined. In October 2011, Cold Morning left, and in June 2012, Underbelly left. However shortly after each departure new YouTubers joined, with The Completionist joining in November 2011, and Did You Know Gaming? joining in July 2012. The site was closed down in November 2012, as Google's AdSense program offered better revenue options for the content creators. Normal Boots was relaunched on January 24, 2014, so that the members could upload videos that weren't "YouTube friendly". Jafari alongside the remaining members of NormalBoots, apart from Indie Games Searchlight, came back, with two new YouTubers joining, ProJared and Satchell Drakes. On May 17, 2017, the group announced that they were going to reconnect due to the creators drifting apart. A new YouTube channel was created to unite the creators. During this time Jafari decided to leave to focus on his own channel but would still remain as a founding member.

Game Grumps

Jafari met animator Arin "Egoraptor" Hanson, of whom he had been a fan since the early 2000s, when the latter messaged him on YouTube shortly after his review of DinoCity grew popular. The two eventually became close friends, and in July 2012, Jafari and Hanson announced they would be starting a Let's Play series titled Game Grumps through videos on both their channels. On July 18 of the same year, Jafari and Hanson uploaded their first serials of Game Grumps: Kirby Super Star, Mega Man 7 and The Legend of Zelda: A Link to the Past. On the Game Grumps channel, Jafari and Hanson played games together, typically ones that were retro or nostalgic in style, and commented over them with their own comedic inputs. On June 25, 2013, it was announced that Jafari had left Game Grumps in order to focus on JonTron, and was replaced by Ninja Sex Party singer Dan Avidan on the same day. The announcement was met with backlash by certain fans for its sudden and unexpected announcement without any lead-up, as well as the channel announcing the debut of the spin-off series Steam Train on the same day that Jafari's departure was disclosed.

Collaborations
Jafari has collaborated with multiple YouTube channels, including Ethan and Hila Klein's channel h3h3Productions. From October 2015 to August 2016, Hila Klein was a producer for JonTron. He has made an appearance on James Rolfe's Let's Play series James & Mike Mondays. He made a cameo appearance in Angry Video Game Adventures. Jafari was a featured vocalist in an episode of The Gregory Brothers' viral webseries Songify the News. At the same time, The Gregory Brothers remixed Jafari's review of the bootlegged game, Titenic, and it was released on iTunes.

Jafari has done voice-over work for Did You Know Gaming?, covering episodes on The Legend of Zelda, Banjo-Kazooie, Donkey Kong, Pokémon, Pikmin, Animal Crossing, Dragon Quest, Sonic Boom: Rise of Lyric, and games of Disney franchises. He has covered the development of Star Wars for their spin-off series Did You Know Movies? on fellow YouTube channel, The Film Theorists.

In 2013, before his departure from Game Grumps, Jafari and Hanson appeared in a promotional video produced by Polaris for the Warner Bros. movie Pacific Rim. Around the same time, Jafari appeared in Ninja Sex Party's music video for "Let's Get This Terrible Party Started", which was directed by Hanson. To promote the 2013 World Series, Jafari appeared in an a cappella cover of "Take Me Out to the Ball Game", produced by PepsiCo and musician Mike Tompkins, and uploaded to Maker Studios' Maker Music channel.

In November 2016, Jafari released an album called Love Is Like Drugs with The Gregory Brothers, which reached number two on the Billboard chart of comedy albums of the week of November 26. Later, on December 2, 2018, he collaborated with pitchman Phil Swift in the video "Flex Tape II: The Flexening".

Other work 
Jafari played Banjo-Kazooie in June 2014 on a Twitch stream, to collect donations for Teach For America's GoFundMe campaign. Jafari stated that if the $25,000 proposed goal was hit, he would reprise a cover of Katy Perry's song "Firework" originally recorded for his 2011 review of DinoCity. The full version of the cover was uploaded to Jafari's YouTube channel on February 14, 2016.

In 2016, Jafari was featured as a character alongside other NormalBoots collaborators in the dating sim and visual novel Asagao Academy.

Jafari has provided voice-over work for A Hat in Time, a video game by Gears for Breakfast. He also recorded voice work for Playtonic Games' 3D platforming video game Yooka-Laylee, but the content was removed from the game in a day one patch, in light of his controversial statements on race (see ).

Political views and controversy

Partisanship
In an interview with Breitbart News, Jafari stated that he voted for Barack Obama both times, and that he supported Bernie Sanders in the 2016 primaries, but has said that he does not identify as conservative or liberal, preferring instead to decide on a case-by-case basis.

Controversy
Jafari discussed politics on a livestream hosted by Carl Benjamin on January 27, 2017. On March 12 of the same year, Jafari posted a tweet defending a quote from Iowa representative Steve King, who had tweeted in regards to the United States' policy on immigration: "We can't restore our civilization with somebody else's babies." Jafari defended King's tweet, and later appeared on Twitch streamer Destiny's channel, to explain his views. During this appearance, he said that, "nobody wants to become a minority in their own country", and stressed that he took issue with white people being labeled as racist for wanting to remain a majority. He said that he saw this reaction as hypocritical with how the majorities of other countries are regarded. Over the course of the one-and-a-quarter-hour appearance, he also commented that he had seen statistics that wealthy blacks commit more crimes than poor whites, as well as asking whether the colonization of Africa by European countries was a good thing. Shortly afterwards, many outlets criticized his statements, and specifically questioned his claim about crimes committed by wealthy blacks.

His comments were followed by a small backlash within his fanbase, with partners noting a minor loss of subscribers. Kotaku reported that many of Jafari's longtime fans felt uncomfortable with these views, but still watch his content. Jafari posted a statement on YouTube on March 19, addressing some of his controversial arguments from the stream. On May 18, 2017, it was announced by NormalBoots that after Jafari's comments, he would still play as an honored founder of the group, however he would not play as an active member anymore, and that this was a "mutual understanding", and that he had not been kicked out. In the wake of controversies surrounding NormalBoots member Jared "ProJared" Knabenbauer in May 2019, fellow member Jirard "The Completionist" Khalil claimed in a YouTube comment that Jafari's departure had nothing to do with the controversy surrounding his statements, stating that Jafari felt that he could no longer contribute to the group, due to the extended time it took for him to make videos, and that he had been planning to leave for several months. Khalil also stated that the group made the announcement a few weeks after the controversy, and that they nonetheless chose to make a statement regarding Jafari since certain members, including Khalil and Jafari themselves, were born to immigrant parents. Jafari's controversies were also discussed once more following Knabenbauer's incident.

Jafari recorded voice parts for a minor character in the game Yooka-Laylee. In response to the controversy, an update was issued the same day as the game's April 2017 release, to remove and replace Jafari's voice. The game was reportedly flooded with requests for refunds following his removal. Jafari was kept as a voice talent in A Hat in Time, another game which he had been involved in, despite the controversy, which resulted in mixed reaction, with some people claiming to refuse purchasing the game if he was included in the game. In November 2017, Jafari appeared on a podcast with h3h3Productions. While he was featured on the podcast, he spoke further about his statements, stating that he should not have gone into the subjects he went into without any prior preparation, and claiming that while he did not hold any racist views, he wishes people could "[talk] about these things without witch hunting each other".

Personal life 
In July 2013, coinciding with Jafari's departure from Game Grumps, he announced that he had moved from Los Angeles to New York City. As of 2022, Jafari's Twitter page has listed his location as New England.

Jafari is married to Charlotte "Bear" Claw; the ceremony took place on October 23, 2019.

Filmography

Web series

Video games

Film

See also 
List of YouTube personalities

References

External links

 
 

1990 births
Living people
American film critics
American male video game actors
American male voice actors
American people of Hungarian descent
American people of Iranian descent
American YouTubers
Gaming YouTubers
Internet memes
Maker Studios people
People from Rancho Palos Verdes, California
Surreal comedy
Video game critics
YouTube controversies
YouTube channels launched in 2010
YouTube critics and reviewers